The BBC Sports Personality of the Year Helen Rollason Award is an award given annually as part of the BBC Sports Personality of the Year ceremony each December. The award is given “for outstanding achievement in the face of adversity”, and BBC Sport selects the winner. The award is named after the BBC sports presenter Helen Rollason, who died in August 1999 at the age of 43 after suffering from cancer for two years. Helen Rollason was the first female presenter of Grandstand. After being diagnosed with cancer, she helped raise over £5 million to set up a cancer wing at the North Middlesex Hospital, where she received most of her treatment.

The inaugural recipient of the award was horse trainer Jenny Pitman, in 1999. Other winners include South African Paralympic sprinter Oscar Pistorius, who won the award in 2007. Several recipients have not played a sport professionally, including Jane Tomlinson, who won in 2002, Kirsty Howard (2004), Phil Packer (2009), Anne Williams, who received the award posthumously in 2013, and eight-year-old Bailey Matthews (2015). Michael Watson, who won the award in 2003, had a career in boxing but was paralysed and almost killed in a title bout with Chris Eubank. He won the award for completing the London Marathon, an accomplishment that took him six days. Former footballer Geoff Thomas won the award in 2005; he raised money by cycling the 2,200 miles (3,540.56 km) of the 2005 Tour de France course in the same number of days as the professionals completed it. In 2006, Paul Hunter posthumously received the award, who died from dozens of malignant neuroendocrine tumours – his widow Lindsay accepted the award on his behalf.

Winners

By year

By nationality 
This table lists the total number of awards won by recipients of each nationality, based on the principle of jus soli.

By sport 
This table lists the total number of awards won by recipients' sporting profession.

Notes
 Jane Tomlinson was an amateur athlete who competed in marathons, and triathlons – these represent sporting disciplines of athletics, swimming, and cycling.
 Kirsty Howard was the mascot accompanying David Beckham for the FIFA World Cup qualifier against Greece and later became the final carrier in the Queen's Baton Relay for the 2002 Commonwealth Games.
 Major Phil Packer raised money by rowing across the English Channel, completing the London Marathon, and climbing.
 The fractions refer to Alastair Hignell, who played cricket professionally and rugby union at the top level.

References

General

Specific

Helen Rollason
Awards established in 1999
1999 establishments in the United Kingdom